The name Martin has been used for four tropical cyclones worldwide: For one storm in the Atlantic Ocean, two in the South Pacific Ocean and for one extratropical European windstorm.

In the Atlantic:
 Hurricane Martin (2022) – large but short-lived category 1 hurricane that churned in the open North Atlantic.

In the South Pacific:
 Cyclone Martin (1986) – weak tropical cyclone had only minor effects on land.
 Cyclone Martin (1997) – damaging and deadly Category 3 tropical cyclone that affected the Cook Islands and French Polynesia.
The WMO retired the name Martin from use in the South Pacific basin following the 1997–98 cyclone season.

In Europe:
 Cyclone Martin (1999) – caused devastating damage in southern France in late December 1999, killing 30 people.

See also 
 Tropical Storm Marty